Noyz Narcos, stage name of Emanuele Frasca, also known as Noyz or White Zombie, (born December 15, 1979) is an Italian rapper, beatmaker and writer. He is also a member of the Italian hip-hop collective TruceKlan.

Biography

Beginnings, first crews and Non dormire (1996–2005) 
As a teenager he began playing basketball and cultivating a passion for Nike and graffiti so he joined the TBF crew and Savage Boys. He began his career in a grindcore group together with Metal Carter, but soon realized that his path was that of hip-hop. He entered the world of rap at 19 in the crew Erreaccanegativo, founded by Darko Fetz and Ricky Jd. They released their first album Calma apparente in 1996, but Noyz did not take part in it as he left the crew.  Later in 2000 he worked with Truceboys in the creation of their first EP. He then joined the Roman crew on a permanent basis, contributing to the creation and release of the album Sangue in 2003. The next period, in which the members of the group took on solo careers after the creation of the collective Truceklan, was very positive for Noyz. In July 2005 he released his first solo album entitled Non dormire, disc of 16 tracks in which TruceBoys worked together with other artists of the Roman scene.

La calda notte with Chicoria and Verano zombie (2006–2007) 
Shortly after, Noyz Narcos collaborated with Chicoria (from the project In The Panchine) and they published together La calda notte in October 2006. The album, released by Traffik Records, consisted of a CD containing 13 tracks with collaborations with Truceklan artists and a DVD containing live performances of Truceklan. A music video was never broadcast on TV for its explicitly pornographic content.

In 2007 Noyz Narcos published Verano zombie, an album in which the instrumental sounds of Non dormire are set aside to move to the equally aggressive beat, but not array of guitar. In the album Metal Carter, Gel, Cole, Mystic One, Duke Montana, Chicoria, collaborated with members of the Truceklan, Danno from Colle Der Fomento, Gué Pequeno, Marracash and Vincenzo da Via Anfossi of Dogo Gang. In the same year, together with representatives of Truceklan and Hawk Nelson Noyz played a part in Mucchio selvaggio, a porn film that has become a cult for fans of Hip Hop.

Ministero dell'inferno and the collaboration with DJ Gengis (2008–2009) 
The Ministero dell'inferno collection was released in March 2008, starring the TruceKlan supported by several well-known names of the Italian hip hop scene like Club Dogo, Kaos One, Santo Trafficante, Fabri Fibra, Gente de Borgata, Danno from Colle Der Fomento, and names totally detached from hip hop context: Cripple Bastards, Miss Violetta Beauregarde and Pinta Facile. The atypical nature of the collaboration, the use of samples from the soundtracks of a certain genre film, the dark atmospheres and the dark beats, lyrics focusing exclusively on existential malaise, urban decay, horrific imagery, faced with cruelty, cynicism and total disenchantment wanted to be a breaking point compared to all the Italian rap compilations released until then. The production of the beats was headed by Lou Chano, Fuzzy, Rough, Don Joe, Noyz Narcos, C.U.N.S., Giordy Beat, DJ Gengis Khan. In addition, he starred with Chicoria, Duke Montana and Cole in the short film Ganja Fiction.

In the same year the mixtape The Best Out Mixtape was released, produced by DJ Genghis Khan. The album saw the participation of many Italian MC and was a great success so as to make it necessary to build a second volume, issued in June 2009.

Guilty and B.B.C. with Metal Carter and Duke Montana (2009–2011) 
On the morning of September 18, 2009, during a drug raid called La calda notte Noyz Narcos was detained without being arrested.

On January 29, 2010, Noyz Narcos released his third studio album Guilty, anticipated by video clips for the songs M3 and Mosche nere, respectively published on November 1, 2009, and January 11, 2010. The album includes collaborations with leading members of the Italian rap scene with Club Dogo, Marracash, Fabri Fibra and many others.

In 2011, Noyz Narcos, Metal Carter and Duke Montana founded the BBC (an acronym for "Black Bandana Click"). The first project was supposed to be the album Klan Related, but after the publication of the video of Metal Carter (Undead), Duke Montana (Anthem) and Noyz Narcos (Drag You to Hell) the project failed due to disagreements between Noyz and Duke and the three tracks are collected in the EP BBC Project Single.

The Best of the Beast Tour (2011–2012) 
On October 15, 2011, Noyz Narcos participated in the "HitWeek Festival" in Miami, together with artists like Caparezza and Casino Royale. After returning from America Noyz started his new tour called The Best of The Beast organized by Live Nation, Propaganda Agency and Propapromoz. The tour was created to announce his upcoming album titled Monster originally planned for 2012 and left October 31 from Novara ending December 26 in Cagliari, included 12 dates in the major clubs in Italy. He was accompanied in the tour by members of the Truceklan Mystic One and DJ Genghis Khan. On January 28, 2012, in Milan accompanied by DJ Genghis Khan Noyz Narcos opened the concert of the Dope DOD on their first European tour. The evening is called "The Wild Beat Massacre".

In February 2012, he released the video for Wild Boys, a piece created in collaboration with Gast. On May 31, he opened the concert in Rome of the U.S. hip-hop collective La Coka Nostra in their Masters of the Dark Arts Tour. On July 23, Noyz Narcos and Metal Carter granted an interview for Vice Italy where they recounted their careers before Truceboys until today. On November 15, he was a guest of The Pills on Deejay TV and the same night he edited his new single video "16 Barre" in collaboration with Aban from his album Ordinary Madness-The Good Side.

Monster (2012–2014) 
On May 22, 2012, the single Game Over was published, anticipating the release of the rapper's fourth studio album, entitled Monster and initially planned for the end of the month. On November 23 by Propaganda Agency, the producers of Monster are announced: Denny The Cool, Joe Don, Frenetik Beat, Fritz da Cat, Fuzzy, Kiquè Velasquez, Mace, DJ Shablo, DJ Sine and The Ortopedic.

On March 13, 2013, the album cover and the date of publication were announced, set for April 9. The same day it was announced the videoclip of Attica, published in the Noyz Narcos YouTube channel on March 18. The album was released by Propaganda Agency and distributed by Sony Music. Through Facebook, Propaganda Agency published the first seven dates of Monster Tour 2013 started on March 30 in Genoa. For the tour Noyz enlisted the help of DJ Genghis Khan, Chicoria and Gast. Monster was composed of various members of the Truceklan such as Chicoria, Metal Carter, Mystic One and Gast, even beyond Nex Cassel and Gionni Gioielli, Aban, Vacca and Tormento. There was another collaboration with Fetz Darko after Cinemacciaio and in the album there are two scratch of DJ Genghis Khan. The album debuted in seventh position of the Italian Ranked album. On April 18, the video Rob Zombie of Salmo in collaboration with Noyz was published, while on May 13 the third video clip from Monster was released, Alfa Alfa.

On July 13, 2013, in Milan he opened the concert of Wu-Tang Clan and two days later he published the video clip of the title track Monster, directed by Trash Secco. Still in 2013, Noyz Narcos embarked on a series of collaborations, including one with Fritz da Cat in the song With or Without It (also attended by the Calibro 35), originally entered in Leaks and later in Fritz, and with DJ Genghis Khan in Casey Jones, inserted in the mixtape Rome Sweet Home.

Between the end of 2013 and beginning of 2014, Noyz Narcos has published two other video clips extracted from Monster: Dope Boys and Drive Solo. The video clips were respectively published on November 20, 2013, and February 14, 2014.

Localz Only (2015) 
In May 2015, Noyz Narcos announced the release of a studio album made in collaboration with the producer Fritz da Cat. Distributed by Universal Music Group, the album is called Localz Only and was scheduled for June 1 of that year. To anticipate the release was the videoclip of the title track Localz Only, released on May 14.

Enemy (2018) 
In March 2018, Noyz Narcos announced the release of his 7th album, made with the producer The Night Skinny. Distributed by Universal Music Group and Thaurus, the album is called "Enemy" and was scheduled for April 20 of that year. To anticipate the release was the videoclip of the title track Sinnò Me Moro, released on April 5.

Virus (2022) 
On December 8, 2021, Noyz Narcos announced the release of his sixth album "Virus" through a video. Five days later, the release of the documentary "Dope Boys Alphabet" was revealed; a documentary showing Noyz's career, from the very beginning to his latest work.

Virus was finally released on January 14, 2022, through Thaurus Music label, mainly produced by The Night Skinny. Many Italian and worldwide artists took part to collaborations, including Gué Pequeno, Sfera Ebbasta and Raekwon from Wu-Tang Clan.

Discography

Albums

Solo
 2005 – Non dormire
 2006 – La Calda Notte with Chicoria
 2007 – Verano zombie
 2008 – The Best Out Mixtape with DJ Gengis Khan
 2009 – The Best Out Mixtape Vol. 2 with DJ Gengis Khan
 2010 – Guilty
 2013 – Monster
 2015 – Localz Only with Fritz da Cat
 2018 – Enemy
 2022 – Virus – No. 1 Italy

With Truceklan
 2008 – Ministero dell'inferno

With Truceboys
 2003 – Sangue

Singles

Solo
 2005 – Non dormire
 2006 – La Calda Notte with Chicoria
 2007 – Verano zombie pt. 2
 2010 – Mosche nere
 2010 – Sotto indagine
 2010 – Zoo de Roma
 2011 – Drag you to Hell
 2011 – Nemico pubblico
 2012 – Game Over
 2013 – Alfa Alfa
 2013 – Monster
 2013 – Dope Boys with Nex Cassel

Extra-musical activities

TV participations 
 2008 – Rapture (All Music)
 2009 – TRL (MTV) (performance with Club Dogo)
 2010 – Hip Hop TV 2nd B-Day Party (Hip Hop TV)
 2011 – Centocelle INK (Flop TV)
 2011 – Hip Hop TV 3rd B-Day Party (Hip Hop TV)
 2012 – Hip Hop TV 4th B-Day Party (Hip Hop TV)
 2012 – The Pills (Deejay TV)
 2013 – The Flow (Deejay TV)
 2013 – Hip Hop TV 5th B-Day Party (Hip Hop TV)

Radio participations 
 2009 – Radio disagio
 2013 – One Two One Two (Radio Deejay) (with Vacca)
 2013 – Doppia Acca (Burger Radio)

Filmography 
 2006 – La calda notte
 2007 – Mucchio selvaggio
 2008 – Ganja Fiction

Soundtracks 
 2007 – Mucchio selvaggio
 2008 – Ganja Fiction
 2013 – Le formiche della città morta

Tours 
 2010/2011 – Guilty Tour
 2012 – The Best of The best Tour
 2013 – Monster Tour
 2013/2014 – Fritz Tour with Fritz Da Cat and Ensi
 2014 – Rome Sweet Home Official Tour with DJ Gengis Khan, Il Turco and Er Costa

References 

1979 births
Italian male singers
Italian rappers
Singers from Rome
Living people
Gangsta rappers